The Alabama Music Hall of Fame, first conceived by the Muscle Shoals Music Association in the early 1980s, was created by the Alabama Music Hall of Fame Board, which then saw to its Phase One construction of a  facility after a statewide referendum in 1987. It currently stands in the town of Tuscumbia, Alabama.

Purpose
The Alabama Music Hall of Fame serves to showcase a multitude of different Alabamians who have had a significant impact upon the music industry. From musicians to songwriters, management, and publishing, The Alabama Music Hall of Fame provides several ways of honoring its "achievers," including informative exhibitions, a bronze star on their Walk of Fame, and the achievers' inclusion in the Hall of Fame roster.

Inductees

Plans
Both a second and third phase are being planned as future expansions for the Alabama Music Hall of Fame:
The second addition is going to be a 1500-seat "state of the art" audio-video recording auditorium.
 The third addition is to be a "southern music" research library.

See also
 List of music museums

References

External links
Alabama Music Hall of Fame

Halls of fame in Alabama
State halls of fame in the United States
Music halls of fame
Music museums in Alabama
Museums in Colbert County, Alabama
Florence–Muscle Shoals metropolitan area
Awards established in 1987
1987 establishments in Alabama